Scousburgh is a small community in the parish of Dunrossness, in the South Mainland of Shetland, Scotland, overlooking the picturesque Scousburgh Sand, and Spiggie Loch. From Scousburgh a road leads up the hill to the site of the former Mossy Hill army base. This road has a connection to Scousburgh Hill the site of the now redundant trans horizon transmission dishes. From there another road leads down to the A970 on the east side of the Hill.

References

External links

Scottish Places - Scousburgh

North Sea energy
Transmitter sites in Scotland
Villages in Mainland, Shetland